Thomas Parker (29 August 1845 – 22 September 1880) was an English-born New Zealand cricketer who played for Otago. He was born in Bradford and died in Dunedin.

Parker made two appearances for the team, the first in 1865, and the second almost exactly two years later, in 1867. He scored 5 runs in three innings, including a top score of 4 runs.

In 15 overs of bowling, he took six wickets, including a best bowling analysis of 5-6 - a bowling average of 2.

See also
 List of Otago representative cricketers

External links
Thomas Parker at Cricket Archive

1845 births
1880 deaths
New Zealand cricketers
Otago cricketers
Burials at Dunedin Northern Cemetery